Tapeinosperma campanula is a species of plant in the family Primulaceae. It is endemic to New Caledonia.

References

Endemic flora of New Caledonia
campanula
Vulnerable plants
Taxonomy articles created by Polbot